Lee Hyo-hee (born ) is a South Korean volleyball player. She was part of the South Korea national team and participated in the 2014 FIVB World Grand Prix. She has passed through four clubs in her 20 years professional volleyball career in Korea and achieved Korean V-League championship in each club (2005–06, 2008–09, 2013–14, 2017–18). On club level, she played for Korea Expressway Corporation since 2014. She was the oldest active player in Women Korean V-League in season 2018–19.

At the end of the 2019–20 season, Hyo-hee revealed that she has ended her professional career. She wants to be a coach.

Club career
 Played with Daejeon KGC (1998–2007)
 Played with Incheon Heungkuk Life Pink Spiders (2007–2010)
 Played with Hwaseong IBK Altos (2011–2014)
 Played with Korea Expressway Corporation (2014–2020)

Awards
 2007–2008 Korean V-League - Setter Award
 2008–2009 Korean V-League - Setter Award
 2013–2014 Korean V-League - Season MVP
 2014–2015 Korean V-League - Season MVP & Best 7

References

External links
 Profile at FIVB.org
 Profile at KOVO

1980 births
Living people
South Korean women's volleyball players
Place of birth missing (living people)
Asian Games medalists in volleyball
Volleyball players at the 2014 Asian Games
Volleyball players at the 2018 Asian Games
Olympic volleyball players of South Korea
Volleyball players at the 2016 Summer Olympics
Medalists at the 2014 Asian Games
Medalists at the 2018 Asian Games
Asian Games gold medalists for South Korea
Asian Games bronze medalists for South Korea
People from Suwon
Sportspeople from Gyeonggi Province